Elijah I. Mitchell (born May 2, 1998) is an American football running back for the San Francisco 49ers of the National Football League (NFL). He played college football at Louisiana.

Early life and high school
Mitchell grew up in Erath, Louisiana and attended Erath High School, where he played high school football. As a senior, he only played in eight games due to injury but still rushed for 1,903 yards and 28 touchdowns. In three seasons as Erath's starting running back, Mitchell rushed for 4,045 yards and 50 touchdowns on 457 carries.

College career
Mitchell played college football for his home state of Louisiana at the University of Louisiana at Lafayette. Mitchell rushed for 257 yards and four touchdowns on 42 carries as a freshman before breaking a bone in his foot and missing the rest of the season. As a sophomore, he rushed for 977 yards and 13 touchdowns and caught 20 passes for 349 yards and three touchdowns and was named Second-team All-Sun Belt Conference. In his junior season Mitchell was again named second-team All-Sun Belt after rushing for 1,147 yards and 16 rushing touchdowns. In his final season with the Cajuns, Mitchell was once again the team’s leading running back and was named first-team All-Sun Belt after carrying the ball 141 times for 878 yards with eight touchdowns and also caught 16 passes for another 153 yards. In total Mitchell played in 42 games and carried the ball 527 times in college for 3,267 yards with 41 rushing touchdowns, he also caught 49 passes for 597 yards and five touchdowns.

Collegiate statistics

Professional career

Mitchell was drafted by the San Francisco 49ers in the sixth round, 194th overall, of the 2021 NFL Draft. He signed his four-year rookie contract on May 13, 2021.

2021 season 
Mitchell played his first regular season game on September 12, 2021, against the Detroit Lions, finishing with 19 carres for 104 rushing yards and a touchdown as the 49ers won 41–33. In Week 7, against the Indianapolis Colts, he had 18 carries for 107 rushing yards and one rushing touchdown in the 30–18 loss. In the following game, against the Chicago Bears, he had 18 carries for 137 rushing yards and one rushing touchdown in the 33–22 victory. In Week 12, against the Minnesota Vikings, he had 27 carries for 133 rushing yards and one rushing touchdown in the 34–26 victory. 

On January 2, 2022, in Week 17 against the Houston Texans, Mitchell broke the 49ers' single-season rookie rushing record, rushing for 878 yards in 10 games and surpassing Vic Washington's record 811 yards in 14 games from the 1971 season. Against the Texans, he had 21 carries for 119 rushing yards to go along with a receiving touchdown in the 23–7 victory. He finished with 207 carries for 963 rushing yards and five rushing touchdowns to go along with 19 receptions for 137 receiving yards and one receiving touchdowns in 11 games and ten starts. In the Wild Card Round against the Dallas Cowboys, he had 27 carries for 96 yards and a rushing touchdown in the 23–17 victory.

2022 season 
On September 13, 2022, Mitchell was placed on injured reserve after suffering a sprained MCL in Week 1. He was activated on November 12. He suffered an MCL tear in Week 12 and was placed on injured reserve on December 3. He was activated on January 7, 2023. In the 2022 season, he appeared in five games and had 45 carries for 279 rushing yards and two rushing touchdowns, which both came in Week 18 against the Arizona Cardinals. In the Wild Card Round against the Seattle Seahawks, he had a seven-yard touchdown reception in the 41–23 victory.

NFL career statistics

Regular season

Postseason

References

External links

San Francisco 49ers bio
Louisiana Ragin' Cajuns bio

Living people
American football running backs
San Francisco 49ers players
Louisiana Ragin' Cajuns football players
People from Erath, Louisiana
Players of American football from Louisiana
1998 births